Manish Wadhwa (born 1972) is an Indian actor and voice actor. He is best known for his roles Chanakya in Chandragupta Maurya, Kans in Paramavatar Shri Krishna and Amal Nanda/Dansh in Hero – Gayab Mode On.

Filmography

Films

Television 
Aamrapali (2002) as Ajatashatru
Netaji Subhas Chandra Bose: The Forgotten Hero as Col. Inayat Kiani
Mitwa Phool Kamal Ke as Nirbhay Choudhary
Kohinoor as Kaali
Chandragupta Maurya (2011) as Chanakya
Devon Ke Dev...Mahadev as Ravan
Iss Pyaar Ko Kya Naam Doon? Ek Baar Phir as Niranjan Agnihotri
Maha Kumbh: Ek Rahasaya, Ek Kahani as Shivanand
Time Machine as Kartik Devraj (KD)
Siya Ke Ram as Vishwamitra
Naagarjuna – Ek Yoddha as Vasuki
Crime Patrol - Crime Patrol In Chambal as Dacoit Leader (Season 3 - Episode 1)
Peshwa Bajirao (TV series) as Balaji Vishwanath
Paramavtar Shree Krishna as Kans
Kahat Hanuman Jai Shri Ram as Ravana
Hero – Gayab Mode On as Amal Nanda (Veer's father)/Dansh, the main antagonist turned positive

Dubbing career
He began his career performing at the theatre in Mumbai for comedy show Khatta Meetha. He has also recorded voices for commercials and Hindi dubbed movies. He is also a member of AVA India, which is an association group for Indian actors and voice artists. He is known for dubbing for Sebastian Stan as Bucky Barnes / Winter Soldier in Marvel Cinematic Universe films in Hindi.

Dubbing roles

Live action television series

Live action films

Hollywood films

South Indian films

Animated films

See also
Dubbing (filmmaking)
List of Indian Dubbing Artists

Awards
 Apsara best actor award
 Indian Telly Awards 2012 best actor in lead role jury award

See also
 Dubbing (filmmaking)
 List of Indian dubbing artists

References

1972 births
Living people
Indian male film actors
Indian male television actors
Indian male voice actors
Male actors from Mumbai
21st-century Indian male actors

id:Manish Wadhwa
sr:Манисх Вадхва